The single station La Despensa is part of the massive transport system Bogotá, TransMilenio, opened in the year 2000.

Location 

The station is located in the northeast sector of Soacha, specifically on the Autopista Sur between 55 and 56 streets.

History 
The opening of the season was delayed due to delays in the construction of Phase I in Soacha.

The station is named in reference to the neighborhood La Despensa, which is the border between the municipality of Soacha and Bogotá. Also meets the demand of the Industrial Zone Cazucá, and neighborhoods Station, Bosa and its surroundings.

Service Station

Core Services 

|}

Location

References

External links 
 TransMilenio
 www.surumbo.com official interactive query system TransMilenio maps

TransMilenio